Hussein Hamdy (Arabic: حسين حمدي). He currently plays as a center forward for FC Masr.

Career
He started his career in Egyptian Premier league in the season (2010–2011) with Misr El Makasa
He moved to Zamalek in the summer transfer of the season (2011–2012), and returned to Misr El Makasa in the winter transfer of that season.

References

1985 births
Living people
Egyptian footballers
Egyptian Premier League players
Misr Lel Makkasa SC players
Zamalek SC players
Telephonat Beni Suef SC players
Haras El Hodoud SC players
FC Masr players
Association football forwards
People from Sharqia Governorate